J.D. Adams may refer to:

J.D. Adams, contestant on American Idol season 2
J.D. Adams & Company, equipment manufacturer 1885–1960
Joseph D Adams, founder J.D. Adams & Co
J.D. Adams, Oregon author and electronics engineer.

Adams, J.D.